Mamenchisauridae is a family of sauropod dinosaurs belonging to Eusauropoda known from the Jurassic and Early Cretaceous of Asia and Africa. Some members of the group reached gigantic sizes, amongst the largest of all sauropods.

Classification
The family Mamenchisauridae was first erected by Chinese paleontologists Yang Zhongjian ("C.C. Young") and Zhao Xijin in 1972, in a paper describing Mamenchisaurus hochuanensis.

The most complete cladogram of Mamenchisauridae is presented by Moore et al., 2020, which includes several named species. Notably, some iterations of their analysis recover Euhelopus and kin, usually considered somphospondylians, as relatives of mamenchisaurids, mirroring earlier conceptions about the family.

Topology A: Implied-weights analysis, Gonzàlez Riga dataset

Topology B: Time-calibrated Bayesian analysis, Gonzàlez Riga dataset

In addition to several taxa above, a paper by Ren et al. (2022) also includes Rhoetosaurus, Spinophorosaurus, and Yuanmousaurus within the family.

Paleobiology
Long-bone histology enables researchers to estimate the age that a specific individual reached. A study by Griebeler et al.

Paleoecology
Fossils of Mamenchisaurus and Omeisaurus have been found in the Shaximiao Formation, dating to the Oxfordian-Tithonian interval, around 159-150 Ma (million years ago). Chuanjiesaurus fossils date between 166.1 and 163.5 Ma, while those of Eomamenchisaurus were found in the Zhanghe Formation, believed to be around 175.6-161.2 million years old. Fossils of Tonganosaurus date to even earlier, from the (Pliensbachian) Early Jurassic. The Tendaguru Formation taxon Wamweracaudia from Tanzania extends the geographic distribution of Mamenchisauridae into Africa, while fossil remains from the Itat Formation in Russia suggest they also reached Siberia. Additionally, an indeterminate cervical vertebra from the Phu Kradung Formation of Thailand demonstrates survival of Mamenchisauridae into the Cretaceous combined with new radiometric dates for the Suining Formation that has yielded fossils of Mamenchisaurus anyuensis.

References

Sources
 

Sauropods
Toarcian first appearances
Early Cretaceous extinctions
 
Prehistoric dinosaur families